The 2023 Men's FIH Hockey World Cup was the 15th edition of the Men's FIH Hockey World Cup, the quadrennial world championship for men's national field hockey teams organized by the International Hockey Federation. It was held at the Kalinga Stadium in Bhubaneswar and at the 20,000 seat Birsa Munda International Hockey Stadium in Rourkela, India from 13 to 29 January 2023. On 5 January 2023, Hockey India launched the hockey anthem, Jai Ho Hindustan Ki for the world cup. This was composed by Prem Anand and sung by Sukhwinder Singh.

Germany won their third title after defeating the defending champions Belgium in the final 5–4 in a shoot-out after the match finished 3–3 in regular time. The Netherlands captured the bronze medal by winning 3–1 against Australia.

Host selection
The International Hockey Federation announced in December 2018 that the 2022 Hockey World Cups would be held either in July 2022 or January 2023. The FIH received the following final three bids for the Men's 2022 World Cup. In November 2019, India was confirmed to host the tournament in January 2023.

For the preferred time window 1–17 July 2022:
Belgium
Germany (withdrew)
Malaysia
Spain (withdrew)

For the preferred time window 13–29 January 2023:
India

Teams

Qualification
Just as in 2018, 16 teams competed in the tournament. Alongside hosts, India, the five continental champions received an automatic berth. After the postponement of the 2020 Summer Olympics the quota of places available through continental championships including the World Cup hosts was increased from six to sixteen.

Draw
The draw took place on 8 September 2022.

Squads

The sixteen national teams were required to register a playing squad of eighteen players and two reserves.

Venues
Following is a list of all venues and host cities.

Umpires
On 29 November 2021, 18 umpires were appointed by the FIH for this tournament. Before the tournament, the final list was published.

Rawi Anbananthan (MAS)
Dan Barstow (ENG)
Bruce Bale (ENG)
Federico García (URU)
Ben Göntgen (GER)
Gareth Greenfield (NZL)
Marcin Grochal (POL)
Lim Hong Zhen (SGP)
Martin Madden (SCO)
Jakub Mejzlík (CZE)
Germán Montes de Oca (ARG)
Raghu Prasad (IND)
Sean Rapaport (RSA)
Steve Rogers (AUS)
Javed Shaikh (IND)
David Tomlinson (NZL)
Coen van Bunge (NED)
Jonas van 't Hek (NED)

Controversies
A pool match played between South Korea and Japan on 17 January ended in controversy after a late match substitution led to 12 Japanese players being on the pitch. According to an FIH statement "In the last moments of today's FIH Hockey Men's World Cup match between Japan and Korea, the Japanese team had 12 players on the field of play, instead of a maximum of 11 as stipulated in the FIH Rules of Hockey". Following discussion with FIH officials, the Japanese team explained that the incident was an accident and expressed their apologies to the FIH and opposition. The FIH is investigating the incident.

First round
The schedule was published on 8 September 2022.

All times are local (UTC+5:30).

Pool A

Pool B

Pool C

Pool D

Classification round

9th–16th place classification

13th–16th place classification

9th–12th place classification

Second round

Bracket

Crossovers

Quarter-finals

Semi-finals

Third and fourth place

Final

Final ranking

Awards
The following awards were given at the conclusion of the tournament.

Goalscorers

See also
 2022 Women's FIH Hockey World Cup
 2023 Men's FIH Hockey Junior World Cup
 2023 Men's FIH Indoor Hockey World Cup

Notes

References

 
World Cup
Men's Hockey World Cup
International field hockey competitions hosted by India
FIH Hockey World Cup
Hockey World Cup
Sport in Bhubaneswar
Rourkela